The National Union of Distributive and Allied Workers (NUDAW) was a trade union in the United Kingdom.

History
The union was founded in 1921, when the Amalgamated Union of Co-operative Employees merged with the National Union of Warehouse and General Workers.  The Co-operative Insurance Staff union split in 1922, but several small unions joined during the 1920s, and membership reached 96,000 by 1926, rising to 274,000 in 1946, the year that the Journeymen Butchers' Federation of Great Britain joined.  By this point, four-tenths of its members were women.

In 1947, NUDAW merged with the National Amalgamated Union of Shop Assistants, to form the Union of Shop, Distributive and Allied Workers. Joseph Hallsworth was General Secretary of the union for its entire existence.

Election results
The union stood a large number of Labour Party candidates, many of whom won election.

Leadership

General secretaries
1921: Joseph Hallsworth

General presidents
1921: John Jagger
1942: Percy Cottrell

References

 
Defunct trade unions of the United Kingdom
1921 establishments in the United Kingdom
Trade unions established in 1921
Retail trade unions
Food processing trade unions
Food processing industry in the United Kingdom
Trade unions disestablished in 1947
Trade unions based in Greater Manchester